Taras Bulba is a 1962 American Color by Deluxe in Eastmancolor adventure film loosely based on Nikolai Gogol's novel Taras Bulba, starring Tony Curtis and Yul Brynner. The film was directed by J. Lee Thompson. The story line of the film is considerably different from that of Gogol's novel, although it is closer to his expanded 1842 (pro-Russian Imperial) edition than his original (pro-Ukrainian) version of 1835.

Plot
The film opens in the 16th century, when Ukraine, Russia, Poland and elsewhere in eastern Europe were divided into small sections and principalities that fought each other or against one enemy: in this case, the Ottoman Empire. It starts  with a battle raging between the Turks and the Poles. The Poles are losing until the Cossacks arrive to save the day. However, it turns out that the Poles were merely holding back so that they could treacherously attack the Cossacks after they won the battle for them. As a result, the Poles become masters of Ukraine and the Cossacks are subjugated. Taras Bulba, one of the Cossack officers, returns home to raise his family but now it is under Polish dominion.

Several years later, Taras sends his two sons, Andriy (Tony Curtis) and Ostap (Perry Lopez) to the academy at Kiev, to obtain a Polish education. There, the eldest son, Andriy, falls in love with a Polish princess Natalia Dubrov (played by Christine Kaufmann), to the ire of the locals, who treat the Cossack brothers like scum of the earth. Ultimately, the brothers are forced to flee Kiev, returning to their father’s house on the Ukrainian steppes.

There, word comes that the Poles want the Cossacks to raise an army to help them in a new war in the Baltic region. When Andriy objects, he is accused of being a coward. This is a serious offense that can only be resolved by a test of courage. Andriy and his accuser ride and jump their horses over a chasm until God chooses which one is right by having the accuser fall to his death. Taras embraces Andriy’s lead and plans to betray the Poles and take back Ukraine.

Assuming command of the Cossacks, Taras leads them to Dubno, where the Poles are expecting him to join them. Instead, the Cossacks attack the Polish army and drive it back into the city. The Cossacks then lay siege to the city. Hunger and disease set in and Andriy, fearing for the life of his Polish lover, sneaks into the city in an attempt to rescue her. He is captured and she is condemned to be burned at the stake for the crime of loving a Cossack. To save her, Andriy agrees to lead a raiding party to bring cattle into the starving city.

Meanwhile, the Cossacks have grown bored with the inactivity of the siege and a large number of them have departed for home. When the Polish commander realizes the weakness of the Cossacks against the raiding force, he orders his whole army to attack. Taras Bulba encounters his son on the field of battle and kills him for his betrayal before joining the general retreat to the edge of a cliff. There, the Cossacks who left the siege to go home rejoin the battle and large numbers of men and horses, both Cossack and Polish, are pushed over the edge to their deaths in the river below.

The movie ends with the Cossacks victorious and entering Dubno. Andriy is to be buried there, as “... it is now a Cossack city.” By the words of Hetman Taras Bulba, the Cossacks will not treat the Poles as badly as they were treated by them: "We will not ravage. We will not pillage. We will burn out the plague, and open the supply wagons, and feed the people of our city."

Cast

 Tony Curtis as Andriy Bulba
 Yul Brynner as Taras Bulba
 Christine Kaufmann as Natalia Dubrov
 Sam Wanamaker as Filipenko
 Brad Dexter as Shilo
 Guy Rolfe as Prince Grigory
 Perry Lopez as Ostap Bulba
 George Macready as Governor
 Ilka Windish as Sofia Bulba
 Vladimir Sokoloff as Old Stepan
 Vladimir Irman as Grisha Kubenko
 Daniel Ocko as Ivan Mykola
 Abraham Sofaer as Abbot
 Mickey Finn as Korzh
 Richard Rust as Capt. Alex
 Ron Weyand as Tymoshevsky
 Vitina Marcus as Gypsy princess

Production

Development
The film was a long-time dream project for director Robert Aldrich who worked on it for five years. He said they did "four or five" scripts of the novel, the last of which was "sensational". In January 1959 it was announced the film would be made in Yugoslavia as a co-production between Aldrich & Associates and Avala Films of Yugoslavia. The budget was to be $3 million and Anthony Quinn would play the lead. David Chantler wrote the script. It would be the first American-Yugoslavian co-production. Financing fell through at the last minute and the film was cancelled in March. Aldrich still wanted to make it but fell into financial trouble and ended up selling the script. In May 1959 it was announced Joseph Kaufman had purchased the script and associated research materials from Aldrich for $100,000. 

Aldrich claimed Kaufman was acting as a front for producer Harold Hecht,  who had been long associated with more social realist dramas starring Burt Lancaster. After deciding to do some projects without Lancaster, Hecht began working on several films including this adaptation of Gogol's story. The work attracted him because "it was color, flamboyancy, but most of all, a strong personal story, difficult to come by in spectacle."

Casting
In February 1961 Hecht signed Tony Curtis, simultaneously negotiating a co-production deal with the actor's film production company, Curtleigh Productions. In July Yul Brynner's casting was announced. The same month he signed on director J. Lee Thompson, who had just completed Cape Fear. "The spectacle will come second," said Thompson. "The important things are the storyline, credibility and the characterizations." After doing a location of ten countries it was decided to film in Argentina.

The female lead would be played by German-Austrian actress Christine Kaufmann who had starred in Town Without Pity. She signed a two-year six-film contract with Hecht. The same month Van Heflin said he would be starring in a rival Taras Bulba movie to be shot in Europe. Susan Hampshire was meant to play a role but reportedly pulled out when her personal relationship with Thompson ended.

Filming
Filming began in Argentina on 10 October 1961. The unit was based in the town of Salta. The filming on location in Argentina continued until the end of the year before the production returned to Hollywood; wrapping up in late February.

Thompson called Brynner "an open air actor who needs a big expanse, a big tour de force. He is a marvelous Taras and a fine actor, but should never play comedy." The director also admired Curtis saying "he has really fought and is so eager and he has never stopped working. His is a very romantic part but not as flashy as Yul's."

Music
The score was composed by Franz Waxman, and film composer Bernard Hermann considered it one of the best scores ever written. The music has been nominated in:
 35th Academy Awards (April 8, 1963) - nominated for an Oscar in Music Score — Substantially Original (lost to Maurice Jarre and his work on Lawrence of Arabia)
 AFI's 100 Years of Film Scores (2005) – nominated.

Release 
The film was budgeted at $3.8 million but went $2.2 million over. After poor sales at the box office, it ended up costing United Artists about $4.5 million. To help market the film, a novelization of the film by Robert W. Krepps was issued to tie-in with the screenplay written by Waldo Salt and Karl Tunberg, an adaptation of Gogol's original story.

Home media
On 25 March 2008 the film was released on DVD in Regions 1 and 2. This is its first release on DVD. On 23 September 2014 a Blu-ray version was released by Kino Video in the United States.

See also
 List of American films of 1962

References

External links
 
 
 
 

1960s adventure drama films
1962 drama films
1962 films
American adventure drama films
Curtleigh Productions films
Films based on Taras Bulba
Films directed by J. Lee Thompson
Films produced by Harold Hecht
Films scored by Franz Waxman
Films set in the 16th century
Films set in Kyiv
Films set in Ukraine
Films shot in Argentina
Films shot in California
Films with screenplays by Waldo Salt
United Artists films
1960s English-language films
1960s American films